Metropolitan Tower is a skyscraper in Youngstown, Ohio. It has been the tallest building in the city since its completion in 1929, surpassing the Wick Building. It was listed in the National Register of Historic Places in 1980.

References

emporis.com

External links

Skyscrapers in Ohio
Commercial buildings on the National Register of Historic Places in Ohio
Art Deco architecture in Ohio
Office buildings completed in 1929
Buildings and structures in Youngstown, Ohio
National Register of Historic Places in Mahoning County, Ohio
Skyscraper office buildings in Ohio